Zinc finger protein 846 is a protein that in humans is encoded by the ZNF846 gene.

References

Further reading 

Human proteins